Route 86 may refer to:

London Buses route 86
M86 (New York City bus), also referred to as the 86th Street bus
Melbourne tram route 86

See also
List of highways numbered 86

86